Esther Mayambala Kisaakye is a Ugandan judge. She is a Justice of the Supreme Court of Uganda. She was appointed to that position in July 2009.

Education
She obtained her High School Diploma from Trinity College Nabbingo, an all-girls middle and high school (grades 8 – 13), located in Nabbingo, in Wakiso District in the Buganda Region of Uganda.

Her first degree is a Bachelor of Laws, Upper Second Division, from Makerere University, in Kampala, Uganda's capital and largest city. She also holds a Diploma in Legal Practice from the Law Development Center, also in Kampala. Esther Kisaakye holds a Master of Laws from Georgetown University Law Center, in Washington, DC, in the USA. Her degree of Doctor of Juridical Science (SJD), was obtained from the American University, also in Washington, with the help of an international fellowship from the American Association of University Women and on a scholarship grant from the Margaret McNamara Memorial Fund.

Career
Prior to her appointment to the Supreme court, she served as a lecturer at the Faculty of Law at Makerere University. Besides lecturing at Makerere, she served as vice chairperson of the Association of Uganda Women Lawyers, which operated a legal aid clinic. In 1993, she was selected by the Leadership & Advocacy for Women in Africa Program to do a Master of Arts on Women's Rights at Georgetown University Law Center. The East African Journal on Peace & Human Rights published her thesis, "Changing the Terms of the Debate to Resolve the Polygamy Question in Africa."

She served as board member of the Uganda AIDS Commission and a co-founder of the Strategic Litigation Coalition. In April 2013 she was appointed the chair of the East African Judicial Committee. In September 2013 Esther Kisaakye was elected as the new president of the National Association of Women Judges in Uganda.
She was part of the panel of the Supreme Court Judges who handled the NUP Party’ Kyagulanyi Ssentamu Robert Presidential Election Petition No. 01 of 2021 that Alleged Electoral Fraud in the 2021 Presidential elections. however there was controversy when she accused the Chief Justice Owiny Dollo of confiscating her file with a minority ruling.

Books Authored
 The Human Rights of Women: International Instruments and African Experiences, published in 2002 by Zed Books
 Employment Discrimination Against Women Lawyers in Uganda: Lessons & Prospects for Enhancing Equal Opportunities for Women in Formal Employment published by American University, Washington College of Law, in 2009

See also
 Judiciary of Uganda

References

External links
 Museveni Finally Sorts Out Judiciary

Year of birth missing (living people)
Living people
Ganda people
Academic staff of Makerere University
Makerere University alumni
Law Development Centre alumni
Washington College of Law alumni
Ugandan women judges
People from Central Region, Uganda
20th-century Ugandan lawyers
21st-century Ugandan judges
Georgetown University Law Center alumni
Justices of the Supreme Court of Uganda
People educated at Trinity College Nabbingo
20th-century women lawyers
21st-century women lawyers
21st-century women judges